Richard Dawes (baptized 13 April 1793, died 10 March 1867) was an English cleric and educationalist. He was the Dean of Hereford from 1850.

Life

Richard Dawes was baptised on 13 April 1793 at Hawes in Yorkshire, the son of James Dawes, who farmed an estate at Hawes, and his wife, Isabella. He had at least three younger brothers. He was educated at the school of the blind Quaker mathematician John Gough at Kendal and proceeded to Trinity College, Cambridge, where he was admitted as a sizar in 1813. He was made a scholar in 1816 and graduated BA as fourth wrangler in 1817, proceeding M.A. in 1820. From 1818 to 1836 Dawes was mathematical tutor, fellow, and bursar of the newly founded Downing College, Cambridge. He was ordained in 1818 and also held the college living of Tadlow, Cambridgeshire, from 1820 to 1840. At this time Dawes was strongly influenced by the contemporary circle of notable Cambridge scientists, including William Whewell, John Stevens Henslow, and Adam Sedgwick. In 1836 he married Mary Helen, daughter of Alexander Gordon, Esq. of Logie, Aberdeenshire and step-daughter of George James Guthrie, Esq.  In 1837 Sir John Mill, his former pupil at Downing, presented him to the rectory of Kings Somborne, Hampshire, where he built a school and developed his ideas on educating the poor. In 1850 he was appointed Dean of Hereford and died of paralysis at the deanery, Hereford, on 10 March 1867, and was buried in the Ladye Arbour of the cathedral. He was survived by his wife.

Legacy

Dawes is remembered for his seminal contribution to the development of applied science in elementary education: traditional teaching was replaced with heuristic learning and a rudimentary laboratory was established to promote the use of technical apparatus and simple scientific experiments.

References

 W. C. Henry, A biographical notice of the Very Revd Richard Dawes, dean of Hereford (1867) 
  'Committee of council on education: minutes', Parl. papers (1847–8), 50.4–14, no. 998 [schools inspected in southern district] 
 'Select committee on scientific instruction', Parl. papers (1867–8), 15.39, no. 432 [minutes of evidence] 
 H. W. Pettit Stevens, Downing College (1899) 
  J. W. Anderson, 'A Hampshire village school', 'The illiterate Anglo-Saxon' and other essays on education, medieval and modern (1946), 142–54 
 Romilly's Cambridge diary, 1832–42: selected passages from the diary of the Rev. Joseph Romilly, ed. J. P. T. Bury (1967) 
 S. French, The history of Downing College, Cambridge (1978) 
 D. Layton, Science for the people (1973) 
 N. Ball, 'Richard Dawes and the teaching of common things', Educational Review, 17/1 (Nov 1964), 59–68 
 J. W. Cross, ed., George Eliot's life as related in her letters and journals, 1 (1885) 
 E. Frankland, Sketches from the life of Edward Frankland, ed. M. N. W. and S. J. C. (privately printed, London, 1902)
 H. H. Moore, A Forgotten Pioneer of a Rational Education and His Experiment, II, Parents' Review volume 15, 1904
 Dawes, Rev. Richard, Suggestive Hints Towards Improved Secular Instruction, 1857

1793 births
1867 deaths
Deans of Hereford
19th-century English educators
English educational theorists
Alumni of Trinity College, Cambridge
Fellows of Downing College, Cambridge
People from Richmondshire (district)
People from Tadlow